Douglas Allen Brindley (born June 8, 1949) is a Canadian retired professional ice hockey forward. Brindley played three games in the National Hockey League for the Toronto Maple Leafs during the 1970–71 season and 103 games in the World Hockey Association with the Cleveland Crusaders between 1972 and 1974. The rest of his career, which lasted from 1969 to 1976, was spent in the minor leagues.

Career statistics

Regular season and playoffs

External links
 

1949 births
Living people
Buffalo Bisons (AHL) players
Canadian expatriate ice hockey players in the United States
Canadian ice hockey centres
Cleveland Crusaders players
Ice hockey people from Ontario
Jacksonville Barons players
Mohawk Valley Comets (NAHL) players
Niagara Falls Flyers players
People from Bruce County
Rochester Americans players
Syracuse Blazers players
Toronto Maple Leafs draft picks
Toronto Maple Leafs players
Tulsa Oilers (1964–1984) players